Wing or Wings, in comics, may refer to:

 Wing (DC Comics), also known as Wing How, is a DC Comics superhero and valet of the Crimson Avenger
 Wing (Elfquest), a character from Elfquest
 Colleen Wing, a Marvel Comics character
 Captain Wings, a Marvel Comics character
 Wings Comics, a Golden Age comic book title published by Fiction House
 "Supergirl: Wings", an Elseworlds one-shot

It may also refer to:

Blackwing, two Marvel Comics characters
Blitzwing, a Transformers character who has appeared in the comics
Darkwing Duck (character), a Disney character
Deathwing (comics), an alternate version of Nightwing/Dick Grayson
Dragonwing, a Marvel Comics character
Dreadwing, a Transformers character made from combining two other robots, including Darkwing
Iron Wings, a 2000 Image Comics mini-series
Nightwing, a number of DC Comics characters
Petalwing, a character from Elfquest
Redwing (comics), a Marvel Comics characters
Red Wing (comics), a DC Comics character
Swingwing, a character from The Boys
Thunderwing, a Transformers character
Webwing, a Marvel Comics character and member of the Imperial Guard
Wingman (comics), a DC Comics character and member of the Batmen of All Nations
Wingman (manga), a manga series
Wingnut (TMNT), a Teenage Mutant Ninja Turtles character
Wingspan (Transformers), a Transformers character
Wyatt Wingfoot, a Marvel Comics character

See also
Wing (disambiguation)

References